Ali Khamis Rashid Al-Neyadi (born 12 November 1977) is an Emirati sprinter. He competed in the men's 200 metres at the 2000 Summer Olympics.

References

1977 births
Living people
Athletes (track and field) at the 2000 Summer Olympics
Emirati male sprinters
Olympic athletes of the United Arab Emirates
Place of birth missing (living people)